Iranshahr High School is Yazd’s first ever public high school, built in 1928.

References

Schools in Iran
Yazd
Educational institutions established in 1928
1928 establishments in Iran